The Canada Cup is an annual international women's softball tournament held at the Softball City Complex in South Surrey, British Columbia.

Format
Following an announcement on June 13, 1991 by the International Softball Federation that women's fastpitch was being made a full-medal sport at the 1996 Summer Olympics in Atlanta, the Canada Cup was created to provide the Canadian national softball team with a world calibre team competition in order to help prepare for Olympic qualifying.

Over the years, the Canada Cup has evolved into one of the most prestigious international softball tournaments.  Today, the competition is split among four separate tournaments:
 Canada Cup: Showcase event, featuring the top women's teams globally
 Canada Cup Futures: featuring about 30 of the top U19 teams globally
 Canada Cup Showcase: featuring top U16 teams
 Canada Cup Special O: a mixed Special Olympics Division

Although a number of US and Japanese club teams have competed in the Canada Cup, the showcase event has evolved primarily into a national team competition between the following countries:

This tournament enjoys strong local support with hundreds of community volunteers.  Each team is assigned a bat girl from one of the local teams plus a family support liaison from the community.  Another unusual part of this tournament is the concurrent co-ed Slow-Pitch 
Friendship Division tournament for developmentally disabled adults which is run at the same site as the premier International Women's Fastpitch tournament.  You can watch both at the same time.

Tournament History

External links 
 Official site

Softball competitions in Canada
Sport in Surrey, British Columbia
Softball in Canada
International softball competitions